Linda Hargrove (married name Bartholomew, born Tallahassee, Florida February 3, 1949 – October 24, 2010, Tallahassee, Florida) was an American country songwriter and musician. She wrote many country music hits for a variety of artists and had a respectable career for herself in the mid-1970s. She was known as "The Blue Jean Country Queen" because she usually performed in jeans and without the elaborate makeup that other female country performers of the time. After marrying and undergoing a religious conversion, she made two gospel albums in the 1980s. She put out her final album in 2005 and died in 2010.

Songs
"Just Get Up and Close the Door" – Johnny Rodriguez took this to No. 1 in 1975
"Let It Shine" – the 1975 recording by Olivia Newton-John went to No. 1 on the Easy Listening chart and No. 5 on the Country chart.
"I've Never Loved Anyone More" (with Michael Nesmith) was the title song of a 1975 Lynn Anderson album and reached No. 14 on the Country chart.
"We've Gone as Far as We Can Go" - recorded by Asleep at the Wheel on their 1976 album "Wheelin' and Dealin'".
"Love Was (Once Around the Dance Floor)" (1978) was Hargrove's only top 40 hit as a performer
"Tennessee Whiskey" (with Dean Dillon) – recorded by David Allan Coe (#77 in 1981), George Jones (#2 in 1983), Meghan Linsey (#28 in 2015), and Chris Stapleton (#1 in 2015)

Discography

Albums

Singles

References

American women country singers
American country singer-songwriters
Elektra Records artists
Musicians from Tallahassee, Florida
1949 births
2010 deaths
Country musicians from Florida
Singer-songwriters from Florida
20th-century American singers
21st-century American singers
20th-century American women singers
21st-century American women singers